Ashtar may refer to:

Ashtar (extraterrestrial being), an allegedly channeled alien with a flying saucer fleet that operates in the vicinity of Earth
Malik al-Ashtar (died 658), companion of Ali Ibn Abi Talib, cousin of Muhammad, and Arab military commander
alternate spelling of the Ethiopian Aksumite god Attar
Ashtar, the Emperor of Darkness, an antagonist in the 1990 video game Ninja Gaiden II: The Dark Sword of Chaos

See also
Ashtar-Chemosh, a Moab goddess in Middle East mythology
Astar (disambiguation)
Ishtar, an ancient Mesopotamian goddess possibly connected to Attar